The 2017–18 NorthPort Batang Pier season was the sixth season of the franchise in the Philippine Basketball Association (PBA). Prior to the Governor's Cup, the team was known as the GlobalPort Batang Pier.

Key dates

2017
October 29: The 2017 PBA draft took place in Midtown Atrium, Robinson Place Manila.

Draft picks

Roster

Philippine Cup

Eliminations

Standings

Game log

|- style="background:#fcc;"
| 1
| December 25
| NLEX
| L 104–115
| Stanley Pringle (33)
| Kelly Nabong (14)
| Stanley Pringle (4)
| Philippine Arena22,531
| 0–1

|- style="background:#fcc;"
| 2
| January 7
| Barangay Ginebra
| L 97–104 
| Sean Anthony (29)
| Kelly Nabong (11)
| Stanley Pringle (10)
| Smart Araneta Coliseum9,000
| 0–2
|- style="background:#bfb;"
| 3
| January 12
| Rain or Shine
| W 78–70
| Stanley Pringle (29)
| Anthony, Nabong (13)
| Sean Anthony (12)
| Mall of Asia Arena
| 1–2
|- style="background:#bfb;"
| 4
| January 19
| Blackwater
| W 101–76
| Sean Anthony (22)
| Stanley Pringle (11)
| three players (5)
| Cuneta Astrodome
| 2–2
|- style="background:#fcc;"
| 5
| January 24
| San Miguel
| L 93–107
| Stanley Pringle (23)
| Anthony, Guinto (7)
| Ryan Araña (4)
| Smart Araneta Coliseum
| 2–3
|- style="background:#bfb;"
| 6
| January 28
| Meralco
| W 107–88
| Jonathan Grey (24)
| Kelly Nabong (17)
| Stanley Pringle (4)
| Smart Araneta Coliseum
| 3–3

|- style="background:#fcc;"
| 7
| February 4
| Alaska
| L 98–105 (OT)
| Stanley Pringle (28)
| Sean Anthony (14)
| Stanley Pringle (6)
| Ynares Center
| 3–4
|- style="background:#bfb;"
| 8
| February 14
| TNT
| W 99–84
| Nico Elorde (17)
| Guinto, Pringle (10)
| Nico Elorde (7)
| Smart Araneta Coliseum
| 4–4
|- style="background:#fcc;"
| 9
| February 16
| Magnolia
| L 81–96
| Kelly Nabong (21)
| Anthony, Nabong (11)
| Nico Elorde (6)
| Smart Araneta Coliseum
| 4–5
|- style="background:#bfb;"
| 10
| February 21
| Kia
| W 108–91
| Anthony, Nabong (21)
| Kelly Nabong (13)
| Nico Elorde (6)
| Smart Araneta Coliseum
| 5–5

|- style="background:#fcc;"
| 11
| March 2
| Phoenix
| L 100–104
| Terrence Romeo (20)
| Yousef Taha (13)
| Stanley Pringle (10)
| Smart Araneta Coliseum
| 5–6

Playoffs

Bracket

Game log

|- style="background:#fcc;"
| 1
| March 6
| Magnolia
| L 79–86
| Stanley Pringle (31)
| Pringle, Taha (10)
| Terrence Romeo (6)
| Mall of Asia Arena
| 0–1

Commissioner's Cup

Eliminations

Standings

Game log

|- style="background:#fcc"
| 1
| April 22
| TNT
| L 114–128
| Sean Anthony (34)
| Malcolm White (12)
| Stanley Pringle (7)
| Smart Araneta Coliseum
| 0–1
|- style="background:#bfb;"
| 2
| April 27
| Meralco
| W 86–85
| Malcolm White (27)
| Malcolm White (17)
| four players (3)
| Smart Araneta Coliseum
| 1–1

|- style="background:#bfb"
| 3
| May 2
| Blackwater
| W 117–106
| Sean Anthony (29)
| Sean Anthony (13)
| Sean Anthony (8)
| Ynares Center
| 2–1
|- style="background:#fcc"
| 4
| May 12
| Magnolia
| L 87–92
| Sean Anthony (20)
| Malcolm White (14)
| Nico Elorde (5)
| Angeles University Foundation Sports Arena
| 2–2
|- style="background:#bfb"
| 5
| May 16
| NLEX
| W 116–94
| Sean Anthony (21)
| Malcolm White (14)
| Stanley Pringle (8)
| Smart Araneta Coliseum
| 3–2
|- style="background:#fcc"
| 6
| May 20
| Rain or Shine
| L 90–96
| Malcolm White (21)
| Sean Anthony (14)
| Nico Elorde (8)
| Smart Araneta Coliseum
| 3–3
|- align="center"
|colspan="9" bgcolor="#bbcaff"|All-Star Break

|- style="background:#fcc"
| 7
| June 2
| Alaska
| L 103–109
| Malcolm White (27)
| Anthony, White (8)
| Elorde, Pringle (6)
| Smart Araneta Coliseum
| 3–4
|- style="background:#bfb"
| 8
| June 13
| San Miguel
| W 98–94
| Malcolm White (25)
| Malcolm White (10)
| Stanley Pringle (8)
| Mall of Asia Arena
| 4–4
|- style="background:#fcc"
| 9
| June 20
| Phoenix
| L 108–135
| Malcolm White (24)
| Anthony, Pringle (7)
| Nabong, Pringle (5)
| Smart Araneta Coliseum
| 4–5
|- style="background:#bfb"
| 10
| June 22
| Columbian
| W 133–115
| Stanley Pringle (50)
| Sean Anthony (17)
| Anthony, Pringle (6)
| Smart Araneta Coliseum
| 5–5

|- style="background:#fcc"
| 11
| July 6
| Barangay Ginebra
| L 98–116
| Malcolm White (19)
| Malcolm White (9)
| Stanley Pringle (7)
| Cuneta Astrodome
| 5–6

Playoffs

Bracket

Game log

|- style="background:#bfb;"
| 1
| July 10
| Rain or Shine
| W 114–113
| Malcolm White (28)
| Malcolm White (16)
| Stanley Pringle (9)
| Smart Araneta Coliseum
| 1–0
|- style="background:#fcc;"
| 2
| July 12
| Rain or Shine
| L 97–103
| Stanley Pringle (23)
| Malcolm White (10)
| Stanley Pringle (8)
| Mall of Asia Arena
| 1–1

Governors' Cup

Eliminations

Standings

Game log

|- style="background:#fcc;"
| 1
| August 19
| NLEX
| L 107–123
| Rashad Woods (42)
| Tautuaa, Woods (12)
| Rashad Woods (8)
| Ynares Center
| 0–1
|- style="background:#fcc;"
| 2
| August 26
| Phoenix
| L 107–123
| Rashad Woods (42)
| Espinas, Tautuaa (8)
| Nico Elorde (6)
| Smart Araneta Coliseum
| 0–2

|- style="background:#fcc;"
| 3
| September 1
| Magnolia
| L 87–104
| Rashad Woods (25)
| Joseph Gabayni (9)
| Moala Tautuaa (6)
| Ynares Center
| 0–3
|- style="background:#fcc;"
| 4
| September 5
| Barangay Ginebra
| L 98–104
| Stanley Pringle (34)
| Rashad Woods (11)
| Stanley Pringle (7)
| Smart Araneta Coliseum
| 0–4
|- style="background:#fcc;"
| 5
| September 19
| Blackwater
| L 111–113
| Rashad Woods (31)
| Rashad Woods (17)
| Sean Anthony (4)
| Smart Araneta Coliseum
| 0–5
|- style="background:#fcc;"
| 6
| September 30
| TNT
| L 102–104
| Rashad Woods (19)
| Moala Tautuaa (14)
| Stanley Pringle (9)
| Smart Araneta Coliseum
| 0–6

|- style="background:#bfb;"
| 7
| October 6
| Columbian
| W 118–101
| Pringle, Tautuaa (26)
| Tautuaa, Woods (10)
| Stanley Pringle (7)
| Ynares Center
| 1–6
|- style="background:#bfb;"
| 8
| October 12
| Meralco
| W 99–94
| Sean Anthony (26)
| Pringle, Tautuaa (8)
| Anthony, Pringle (3)
| Mall of Asia Arena
| 2–6
|- style="background:#fcc;"
| 9
| October 17
| Rain or Shine
| L 98–120
| Rashad Woods (30)
| Sean Anthony (15)
| Stanley Pringle (12)
| Cuneta Astrodome
| 2–7
|- style="background:#fcc;"
| 10
| October 24
| San Miguel
| L 107–114
| Sean Anthony (24)
| Rashad Woods (15)
| Stanley Pringle (5)
| Cuneta Astrodome
| 2–8
|- style="background:#fcc;"
| 11
| October 28
| Alaska
| L 85–95
| Rashad Woods (33)
| Rashad Woods (13)
| Nico Elorde (5)
| Smart Araneta Coliseum
| 2–9

Transactions

Trades

Preseason

Philippine Cup

Commissioner's Cup

Rookie Signings

Free Agency

Addition

Subtraction

Recruited imports

Awards

References

NorthPort Batang Pier seasons
NorthPort